Billy Ray Bates (born May 31, 1956) is a retired American professional basketball player. Bates played shooting guard at McAdams High in Mississippi and attended Kentucky State University.

Bates played four seasons in the National Basketball Association for the Portland Trail Blazers, Washington Bullets, and Los Angeles Lakers. He also played overseas, in Switzerland, Mexico, Uruguay, and most notably in the Philippines for the Crispa Redmanizers and Ginebra San Miguel of the Philippine Basketball Association.

In the PBA, Bates had a legendary career with Crispa and is considered one of the greatest foreign players in league's history.

NBA career
Billy Ray Bates, the eighth of nine children, played basketball at McAdams High in Mississippi. He later played basketball for Kentucky State University.

The Houston Rockets drafted him in the 3rd round of the 1978 draft. Before the season started, he was cut by the Rockets, after his agent demanded guaranteed money for the third-rounder. He ended up playing for the Maine Lumberjacks in the now-defunct Continental Basketball Association, where he won the league's Rookie of the Year and the slam dunk competition in its All-Star game. Bates is credited for shattering at least four backboards in the Continental league before jumping to the NBA.

After signing a 10-day contract with the Portland Trail Blazers in February 1980, the high-flying ,  guard quickly became a crowd favorite for his slam dunks and energetic playing style. He once scored 40 points in 32 minutes against San Diego and later 35 points in 25 minutes against the Dallas Mavericks. The league also took notice, naming him NBA Player of the Week towards the end of his rookie season. He especially excelled in the playoffs, averaging 25.0 ppg in the 1980 playoffs and 28.3 ppg in the 1981 playoffs (which today still stands as the franchise record).

However, there were signs that Bates, nicknamed "Dunk", would have to make major changes in his game and attitude for him to stick in the NBA. Although he thrilled fans with his aerial exploits, the league's yearbook said he was a great rebounder and dunker, but noted that those skills were not needed for his position. He once slept through the first half of a home game, arriving at halftime.

In September 1982, after three seasons in Portland, he was cut from the team. Bates later checked into a Portland hospital, allegedly for drug treatment.

Bates played briefly with the Washington Bullets in the 1982–83 season, appearing in 15 games before being let go. He then had a 10-day trial with the Lakers (where he supposedly dunked on Kareem Abdul-Jabbar) and appeared in four games, but at  overweight, that didn't work out either. He would never play in the NBA again.

His average of 26.7 points per game in the playoffs stands as the highest in NBA history by a non-starter.

PBA career 
Bates' entry to the Philippine Basketball Association in the mid-1980s caused great changes for that league. In his first game with the Crispa Redmanizers, Bates immediately grabbed the limelight and thrilled the crowd with a spectacular display of inside and outside moves against the league powerhouse, Great Taste Coffee. In that game, Bates would go up against PBA legend Norman Black and exploded for 64 points on 20–25 two-point shots (80%), 5–6 three-point attempts (83%), and 9–10 free throws (90%), along with 12 rebounds and five assists. Black was pretty offensive-minded himself, popping in 59 points in a losing cause, 120–119 against Crispa. Bates would display an accurate jumper even from 3-point range, a muscular upper body to physically match up and intimidate the skinnier/taller opponents, and a mean game from the paint punctuated by his favorite arsenal, the slam-dunk.

Three things stood out in that game. First, Bates scoring 64 points was marvellous because Crispa had a number of superstars on their team. At that time, Crispa didn't need a scoring import since the locals were more than capable of carrying the load. The second remarkable thing was how Bates electrified the crowd with his derring-do style. A lot of Bates's two-pointers came from dunks, around six in that game, ushering in a new era of prototype PBA imports that were benchmarked on Billy Ray Bates. And third, Bates was now under Tommy Manotoc, who was acknowledged back then as the greatest defensive coach of the league. For someone like Bates to be collared with his offensive ways was practically impossible to do, as Manotoc himself later admitted. Manotoc instead decided to change his style to suit the strengths of Bates.

Bobby Factura would write:

 What Doc (Julius Erving) did to revolutionize the slam-dunk in the NBA/ABA during the 70s, Bates did the same for the PBA in the early 80s. His natural ability to hang in the air longer than any defender and at the last instance powerfully slam the ball into the rim brought the shot to the next level. 

He became the Philippine version of Julius Erving, revolutionizing the fastbreak game with his thunderous dunks and long-range bombs, averaging an astonishing 64.5 percent from the field and a high of 64 points in one game. Television game shows had dunking contests on miniature goals.

Bates's scoring ability and flamboyant showmanship plus a charismatic, outgoing personality endeared him to the basketball-watching Filipino public and the media. He was called the Black Superman. A local shoe manufacturer gave him an endorsement coming out with a line of shoes with "Black Superman" emblazoned on it. Bates was so flattered big time with this endorsement that he was spreading the word back home in Mississippi about his success in the Philippines, even having a pair of rubber shoes named after him.

"Those people, they loved me", Bates would tell The Oregonian. "There, I was like Michael Jordan. I could have anything I wanted. All I had to do was snap my fingers. I had my own condo, my own car and my own bodyguard with an Uzi. I had to fight off the women."

Bates won the 1983 Best Import award and helped the Crispa Redmanizers win two championships. Three years later, Bates and Michael Hackett joined forces to give Ginebra its first PBA title in 1986. He returned to Ginebra in 1987 leading all imports with a 54.9 ppg average. His last stint with Ginebra was in 1988, where he teamed up with future Celtics star Kevin Gamble.  But being out of shape, he played in only four games and both players were eventually replaced by the high scoring duo of Joe Ward and Tommy Davis. Billy Ray Bates would be widely regarded by many as one of the greatest imports ever to have played in the PBA.

In Billy Ray's four seasons in the PBA for Crispa and Ginebra, he averaged the all-time league-high of 46.2 points in 98 career games.

Bates later played in Switzerland with the FIBA EuroLeague club Fribourg Olympic, during the 1985–86 season, back in the U.S with the World Basketball League, a few seasons in Mexico—even a season in Uruguay.

Personal life

Childhood

Bates was born the eighth of nine children of Frank and Ellen Bates. He grew up picking cotton, string beans, and corn as the son of Mississippi sharecroppers. His father died when he was seven but figures he took the genes of his   father, a massive yet quiet man who loved his liquor and went on drunken walks through the Mississippi backwoods. He says he took his first swig of Schlitz Malt Liquor beer at age 10. He remembers it gave him a headache for two days, but he also remembers he liked the taste and how it made him feel happy. He was also drinking moonshine by age 14. At 16, he had tried cigarettes and marijuana but didn't like how they made him cough.

Pro career

Bates was part of advertising campaigns during his stint with the Blazers, one involved sporting a milk moustache. As one of the more popular Blazers, his jersey number (12) was a popular choice of kids in local recreation leagues.

Bates's career is an example of what can happen to players unprepared for NBA life in urban environs. Jerome Kersey relates,

After picking Bates up at the Portland airport, then-Blazer trainer Ron Culp advised Billy Ray not to carry large amounts of cash around, but rather to open up a checking account so that he could pay bills with checks.

Bates had a quizzical expression on his face, Culp recalled, and finally worked up the nerve to ask, "What are checks?"

Bates once epitomized the image of hard-partying, sex-crazed athletes in the PBA. His Filipino teammates vividly recall times when Bates downed a couple of beers in the locker room before tip-off. It is believed that he was able to put up Wilt Chamberlain-like numbers in the bedroom, as well as on the court.

In the past, Bates has been vague about the root of his difficulties. In a 1992 interview with The Oregonian, for example, he denied having drug problems.

Incarceration

On January 17, 1998, Bates robbed a New Jersey Texaco station at knifepoint, slashing the ear of attendant Philip Kittel. He was sentenced to seven years in prison. Bates hit bottom when he robbed the gasoline station. At the time, he was living with his wife and stepdaughter while holding two manual-labor jobs in eastern New Jersey.

In his recollection of the events, Bates went to the liquor store, bought a lottery ticket and a half-pint of vodka, which he drank. He then ran into a group of younger kids, who talked of getting cocaine but nobody had the money to buy the drug. Bates suggested the idea of robbing a Texaco station he frequented. He attacked the attendant, 18-year-old Phillip Kittel, with a knife. Although Bates says he never used the weapon, Kittel received three stitches to his ear. The attack was caught on videotape. Bates fled the scene, the knife falling out of his pocket. He was found by the police passed out on a neighborhood lawn blocks away with $7 in his pocket.

Bates was convicted of first degree aggravated assault and second-degree assault, and in June 2000 began serving a sentence at Bayside State Prison in Leesburg, N.J. that carried a maximum of 10 years, 3 months and 24 days and a minimum of 5 years, 11 months and 16 days. He was paroled in March 2005 after completing 85 percent of his minimum sentence (4 years, 9 months and 11 days).

He violated his parole when cocaine showed up in his drug test eighteen months later. Bates went back to Bayside and was released on March 23, 2008.

Bates became an inmate at Hope Hall, a 164-bed halfway house for adult male offenders in Camden, New Jersey During his stay, he has taken part in classes designed to mend damaged cognitive skills, ready himself for the workplace and learn how to manage his emotions. Bates juggled church attendance, Alcoholics Anonymous meetings and shifts at Aluminum Shapes, an aluminum extruder, where he readies products for shipping. In the evenings, he studies reading and writing at Camden Community College.

Bates passed a rehabilitation program in 2008 at a Salvation Army center in Newark, New Jersey. Citing confidentiality laws, Captain Carol Austin only indirectly acknowledged Bates' involvement, saying the last she heard from him he was headed to Portland in 2008.

After being released, Bates lived in two places, a friend's apartment in Manhattan and his wife's home in North Brunswick, New Jersey. He attended a Back to Work program in Manhattan for job referrals. He and former 76ers guard Earl Harrison tried to start a basketball skills coaching clinic.

During the prison sentence, Bates wrote his autobiography titled Born to Play Basketball in ink and pencil on 714 pages of yellow legal paper, front to back. Although featuring rudimentary spelling and painful grammar, Michele Mako, the publisher of Florida Peach Publishing Company, was said to have considered the manuscript. Mako liked Bates' honesty about his past and booked the ex-pro on a three-day, three-night NBA and NFL Speakers Cruise in February 2009 to the Bahamas.

Later life
In 2009, Bates worked for a big grocery supplies chain, then as a floor technician in the 6 p.m. to 4:30 a.m. shift with the Colgate recycling company in New Jersey. Bates and his wife Beverly, have been married for over 20 years. He has a daughter, Jennifer, who lives in Switzerland, where he once played.

To this day, Bates is acclaimed as the greatest import to have played in the Philippine Basketball Association, and in October 2011, the PBA finally recognized his immense and revolutionary contributions to Philippine professional basketball by enshrining him to its version of the Hall of Fame. Bates flew into the Philippines to personally attend the ceremonies while expressing his fervent wish to work as a basketball coach in his "second home".  He got his wish when the Philippine Patriots of the ASEAN Basketball League (ABL) hired him as its skills coach. However, on March 8, 2012, the Philippine Patriots fired him due to "repeated misconduct and acts detrimental to the team and to the league".

Stats

Regular season

Playoffs

PBA

References

External links
The Meteor – Billy Ray Bates by Dave Fitzpatrick, November 10, 2004
Billy Ray Bates stats on Basketball-Reference.com

1956 births
Living people
African-American basketball players
American expatriate basketball people in Mexico
American expatriate basketball people in Switzerland
American expatriate basketball people in the Philippines
American expatriate basketball people in Uruguay
American men's basketball players
American people convicted of assault
American sportspeople convicted of crimes
Barangay Ginebra San Miguel players
Basketball coaches from Mississippi
Basketball players from Mississippi
Charleston Gunners players
Continental Basketball Association coaches
Crispa Redmanizers players
Fribourg Olympic players
Houston Rockets draft picks
Kentucky State Thorobreds basketball players
Los Angeles Lakers players
Maine Lumberjacks players
Ohio Mixers players
People from Kosciusko, Mississippi
Philippine Basketball Association imports
Portland Trail Blazers players
Shooting guards
Washington Bullets players
21st-century African-American people
20th-century African-American sportspeople